Rossum may refer to:

People
 Allen Rossum (born 1975), an American football cornerback and return specialist
 Emmy Rossum (born 1986), an American actress and singer-songwriter
 Kristin Rossum (born 1976), an American convicted of murdering her husband

Places
 Rossum, Gelderland, town in Gelderland, the Netherlands
 Rossum, Overijssel, town in Overijssel, the Netherlands

Fiction 

 R.U.R. (Czech: Rossumovi Univerzální Roboti, English: Rossum's Universal Robots), a 1921 science fiction play by Karel Čapek
 Rossum Corporation, a fictional organization in the television series Dollhouse, named after R.U.R.

See also
 Van Rossum, a surname